Farley is a hamlet in the Derbyshire Dales district, in the English county of Derbyshire. It is near the town of Matlock. The nearest main road is the A6 road.

Hamlets in Derbyshire
Derbyshire Dales